Tertön Sogyal Lerab Lingpa (1856-1926) was a Tibetan Buddhist tertön and a teacher of the Thirteenth Dalai Lama.

Biography
As a child, Tertön Sogyal was taught by Nyala Pema Duddul, Patrul Rinpoche, and Khenpo Pema Vajra at Dzogchen Monastery.

In the later years of his life, he stayed near Dodrupchen Monastery, often exchanging teachings with Dodrupchen Jikmé Tenpé Nyima.

He died on the tenth day of the second lunar month of the year of the Fire Tiger (1926)
.
which is March 23, 1926 in the Gregorian calendar.

Disciples
His disciples included the Thirteenth Dalai Lama Thubten Gyatso, Jamgön Kongtrul, the Fifth Dzogchen Rinpoche (Thubten Chökyi Dorje), Dzogchen Khenpo Pema Vajra, Jamgon Ju Mipham Gyatso, Nyoshul Lungtok, Dzahka Choktrul Rinpoche, Tertön Drimé, Kathok Situ, Minyak Khenpo Kunzang Sonam, Dodrupchen Jikmé Tenpé Nyima, Demo Rinpoche, Dorje Drak Rigdzin Nyamnyi Dorje (1886-1932/5), Minling Trichen Rinpoche, Sakya Trichen, the Fifteenth Karmapa Khakhyab Dorje, Amdo Geshe Jampal Rolwe Lodrö and Jamyang Khyentse Chökyi Lodrö.

His disciples also included Tulku Tsultrim Zangpo (aka Tsüllo) of Shukjung Monastery, who composed a biography of Tertön Sogyal which is more than 700 pages long. His lineage also passed on to his sons, such as Rigdzin Namgyal and Chöpel Gyatso, and to his grandson, Tromgé Tulku Dechen Dorjé, who currently lives at the Tromgé encampment in eastern Tibet (Khams).

Reincarnations
There were three main incarnations of Tertön Sogyal: Khenpo Jigme Phuntsok, Sogyal Rinpoche and Gendün Rinchen (1926-1997), the 69th Je Khenpo of Bhutan.

See also
Simhamukha

References

Further reading
Matteo Pistono. Fearless in Tibet: The life of the Mystic Terton Sogyal, Hay House, Inc, 2014. 
Matteo Pistono. In the Shadow of the Buddha: Secret Journeys, Sacred Histories, and Spiritual Discovery in Tibet, Dutton, 2011. 
Tulku Thondup (1999), Masters of Meditation and Miracles, Shambhala Publications.

External links
Tertön Sogyal series on Lotsawa House
Samten Chhosphel, "Lerab Lingpa," Treasury of Lives, accessed June 16, 2018, http://treasuryoflives.org/biographies/view/Lerab-Lingpa/8538.

1856 births
1926 deaths
Nyingma lamas
Tertöns
Tibetan Buddhists from Tibet
19th-century Tibetan people
20th-century Tibetan people
19th-century lamas
20th-century lamas
People from Kham